was a Japanese farmer and philosopher celebrated for his natural farming and re-vegetation of desertified lands. He was a proponent of no-till, herbicide and pesticide free cultivation methods from which he created a particular method of agriculture, commonly referred to as "natural farming" or "do-nothing farming".

Fukuoka was the author of several books, scientific papers and other publications, and was featured in television documentaries and interviews from the 1970s onwards. His influences went beyond farming to inspire individuals within the natural food and lifestyle movements. He was an outspoken advocate of the value of observing nature's principles.

Life
Fukuoka was born on 2 February 1913 in Iyo, Ehime, Japan, the second son of Kameichi Fukuoka, an educated and wealthy land owner and local leader. He attended Gifu Prefecture Agricultural College and trained as a microbiologist and agricultural scientist, beginning a career as a research scientist specialising in plant pathology. He worked at the Plant Inspection Division of the Yokohama Customs Bureau in 1934 as an agricultural customs inspector. In 1937 he was hospitalised with pneumonia, and while recovering, he stated that he had a profound spiritual experience that transformed his world view and led him to doubt the practices of modern "Western" agricultural science. He immediately resigned from his post as a research scientist, returning to his family's farm on the island of Shikoku in southern Japan.

From 1938, Fukuoka began to practice and experiment with new techniques on organic citrus orchards and used the observations gained to develop the idea of "Natural Farming". Among other practices, he abandoned pruning an area of citrus trees, which caused the trees to become affected by insects and the branches to become entangled. He stated that the experience taught him the difference between nature and non-intervention. His efforts were interrupted by World War II, during which he worked at the Kōchi Prefecture agricultural experiment station on subjects including farming research and food production.

In 1940, Fukuoka married his wife Ayako, and they had five children together. After World War II, his father lost most of the family lands in postwar land reform and was left with three-eighths of an acre of rice land and the hillside citrus orchards his son had taken over before the war. Despite these circumstances, in 1947 he took up natural farming again with success, using no-till farming methods to raise rice and barley. His later book, The One-Straw Revolution, was published in 1975 and translated into English in 1978.

From 1979, Fukuoka travelled the world extensively, giving lectures, working directly to plant seeds and re-vegetate areas, and receiving a number of awards in various countries in recognition of his work and achievements. By the 1980s, Fukuoka recorded that he and his family shipped some 6,000 crates of citrus to Tokyo each year, totalling about 90 tonnes.

During his first journey overseas, Fukuoka was accompanied by his wife Ayako, met macrobiotic diet leaders Michio Kushi and Herman Aihara, and was guided by his leading supporter and translation editor Larry Korn. They sowed seeds in desertified land, visited the University of California in Berkeley and Los Angeles, the Green Gulch Farm Zen Center, the Lundberg Family Farms, and met with United Nations UNCCD representatives including Maurice Strong, who encouraged Fukuoka's practical involvement in the "Plan of Action to Combat Desertification". He also travelled to New York City and surrounding areas such as Boston and Amherst College in Massachusetts.

In 1983, he travelled to Europe for 50 days holding workshops, educating farmers and sowing seeds. In 1985, he spent 40 days in Somalia and Ethiopia, sowing seeds  to re-vegetate desert areas, including working in remote villages and a refugee camp. The following year he returned to the United States, speaking at three international conferences on natural farming in Washington state, San Francisco and at the Agriculture Department of the University of California, Santa Cruz. Fukuoka also took the opportunity to visit farms, forests and cities giving lectures and meeting people. In 1988, he lectured at the Indian Science Congress, state agricultural universities and other venues.

Fukuoka went to Thailand in 1990 and 1991, visiting farms and collecting seeds for re-vegetating deserts in India, which he returned to during November and December that year in an attempt to re-vegetate them. The next year saw him participate in official meetings in Japan associated with the Earth Summit in Rio, Brazil, and in 1996 he returned to Africa, sowing seeds in desert areas of Tanzania, observing baobab trees and jungle country. He taught the making and sowing of clay seed balls in Vietnam during 1995.

He travelled to the Philippines in 1998, carrying out Natural Farming research, and visited Greece later that year to assist plans to re-vegetate 10,000 hectares (40 sq. mi.) around the Lake Vegoritida area in the Pella regional unit and to produce a film of the major seed ball effort. The next year he returned to Europe, visiting Mallorca.

He visited China in 2001, and in 2002 he returned again to India to speak at the "Nature as Teacher" workshop at Navdanya Farm and at Bija Vidyapeeth Earth University in Dehra Dun, Uttarakhand in northern India. On Gandhi's Day, he gave the third annual Albert Howard Memorial Lecture to attendees from all six continents. That autumn he was to visit Afghanistan with Yuko Honma but was unable to attend, shipping eight tons of seed in his stead. In 2005, he gave a brief lecture at the World Expo in Aichi Prefecture, Japan, and in May 2006 he appeared in an hour-long interview on Japanese television network NHK.

Masanobu Fukuoka died on 16 August 2008 at the age of 95, after a period of confinement in bed and in a wheelchair.

Natural farming

Fukuoka called his agricultural philosophy , most commonly translated into English as "natural farming". It is also referred to as "the Fukuoka Method", "the natural way of farming" or "Do-Nothing Farming".

The system is based on the recognition of the complexity of living organisms that shape an ecosystem and deliberately exploiting it. Fukuoka saw farming not just as a means of producing food but as an aesthetic and spiritual approach to life, the ultimate goal of which was "the cultivation and perfection of human beings".

The four principles of natural farming are that:

 human cultivation of soil, plowing or tilling are unnecessary, as is the use of powered machines
 prepared fertilizers are unnecessary, as is the process of preparing compost
 weeding, either by cultivation or by herbicides, is unnecessary; instead, only minimal weed suppression with minimal disturbance should be used
 applications of pesticides or herbicides are unnecessary

Clay seed balls
Fukuoka re-invented and advanced the use of clay seed balls. Clay seed balls were originally an ancient practice in which seeds for the next season's crops are mixed together, sometimes with humus or compost for microbial inoculants, and then are rolled within clay to form into small balls. This method is now commonly used in guerilla gardening to rapidly seed restricted or private areas.

Awards
In 1988, Fukuoka received the Visva-Bharati University's Desikottam Award as well as the Ramon Magsaysay Award for Public Service in the Philippines, often considered "Asia's Nobel Prize".

In March 1997, the Earth Summit+5 forum in Rio de Janeiro presented him with the Earth Council Award, received in person at a ceremony in Tokyo on 26 May of that year, honouring him for his contributions to sustainable development.

In 1998, Fukuoka received a grant of US$10,000 from the Rockefeller Brothers Fund, but the grant was returned because his advanced age prevented him from completing the project.

Influence

In the international development of the organic farming movement, Fukuoka is considered to be amongst the "five giant personalities who inspired the movement" along with Austrian Rudolf Steiner, German-Swiss Hans Müller, Lady Eve Balfour in the United Kingdom and J. I. Rodale in the United States.

His books are considered both farming compendiums and guides to a way of life.

The One-Straw Revolution has been translated into over 20 languages and sold more than one million copies and Fukuoka has been widely influential, inspiring an international movement of individuals discovering and applying his principles to varying degrees, such as Akinori Kimura, David Mas Masumoto and Yoshikazu Kawaguchi, and has significantly influenced alternative movements in the West, such as permaculture.

Rosana Tositrakul, a Thai activist and politician, spent a year studying with Fukuoka on his farm. She then organised a visit by Fukuoka to the Kut Chum District of Yasothon Province in northeastern Thailand, which, together with his books, were influential in the rapid and widespread adoption of organic and chemical-free rice farming in the district.

Reception
In the preface to the US editions of The One-Straw Revolution, Wendell Berry wrote that Fukuoka's techniques are not "directly applicable to most American farms", but ultimately concludes that it would be "a mistake to assume that the practical passages of this book are worthless..." suggesting that Natural Farming would require farmers to have fresh eyes and the right kind of concern for their land in order to come up with methods relevant to their own farms.

Fukuoka's techniques have proven difficult to apply, even on most Japanese farms, and have been described as a sophisticated approach despite their simple appearance. In the initial years of transition from conventional farming there are losses in crop yields. Fukuoka estimated these to be 10% while others, such as Yoshikazu Kawaguchi, have found attempting to strictly follow Fukuoka's techniques led to crop failures and require many years of adaption to make the principles work.

In the early 2000's, Theodor Friedrich and Josef Kienzle of the Food and Agriculture Organization (FAO) opined that his rejection of mechanisation is not justifiable for modern agricultural production and that the system cannot interact effectively with conventional agricultural systems.

More recently however, the FAO (along with multiple research universities and organizations such as the Union of Concerned Scientists) have found conventional industrial agriculture systems to be rooted in unsustainable practices that ignore basic biology and the needs of ecosystems.  Many of Fukuoka's principles are now being incorporated into modern forms of farming that are more biodiverse, less reliant on chemicals and machines, and which produce similar yields while increasing the health of the soil and surrounding environment. In particular, the concepts of non-tillage, relay cropping, cover-cropping, and plant biodiversity have been shown to prevent soil loss, reduce or eliminate the need for pesticides or fertilizers, and reduce flooding, while increasing water retention, and providing habitat for insects that contribute positively to both crop and ecosystem health.

In Japan, where Fukuoka had few followers or associates, his critics argue that the "inner world and the connection between humans and nature does not, however, exhaust reality" and that he did not give sufficient attention to interpersonal relationships or society. These criticisms were in some ways addressed by the next generation of natural farmers in Japan such as Yoshikazu Kawaguchi, who started a movement of widespread free schools, and yearly conferences to help spread the mindset of natural farming. There are now over 40 learning sites and more than 900 concurrent students in the Japanese natural farming network.

Family farm recent developments

Fukuoka's farm in Shikoku was taken over by his son and daughter-in-law in the late 1980s, as Fukuoka reached an advanced age. His grandson also took up farming. Many of the farm's iyokan and amanatsu mikan trees remain, although some old iyokan were replaced by new varieties of fruit. Woodlands remain along with orchards, including some areas of wild vegetables still growing amongst them. Some areas of straw-mulched cropping continue to produce grains and vegetables. The farm also features an orchard area of ginkgo trees, shiitake mushroom crops growing on tree logs in shady woodland, and plantings of limes, grapefruits, feijoas, avocados and mangoes.

The farm is now run using some natural farming techniques: no chemicals, no tillage of the land and no use of composting. Other techniques have been changed; the pattern of irrigation is more conventional to reduce conflicts with neighbours. A do-nothing philosophy has been followed on the hilltop surrounding Fukuoka's hut. Here it has become a natural, fruit-bearing forest with minimal intervention.

Selected works

Articles

Bibliography

In Japanese
 1947 – , self-published, incorporated into later editions.
 1958 – , self-published, later incorporated into .
 1972 – , self-published; republished by Shunjūsha, 1985. 
 1973 – , self-published; republished by Shunjūsha, 1985. 
 1974 – , self-published.
 1975 – ; republished by Shunjūsha, 1983. 
 1975 – , Jiji Press Co. .13-3
 1984 – , Shunjūsha. 
 1992 – , self-published. .
 1997 – . Shunjūsha, .
 2001 – , self-published; republished by Shunjūsha, 2010. 
 2005 – , Shunjūsha,

In English
 1978  1975 Sep. – The One-Straw Revolution: An Introduction to Natural Farming, translators Chris Pearce, Tsune Kurosawa and Larry Korn, Rodale Press.
 1985  1975 Dec. – The Natural Way Of Farming - The Theory and Practice of Green Philosophy, translator Frederic P. Metreaud, published by Japan Publications. 
 1987  1984 Aug. – The Road Back to Nature - Regaining the Paradise Lost, translator Frederic P. Metreaud, published by Japan Publications. 
 2012  –1996 – Sowing Seeds in the Desert: Natural Farming, Global Restoration, and Ultimate Food Security, edited by Larry Korn, Chelsea Green.

Bilingual
 2009 – , Fukuoka. Contains Masanobu's hand-written classical song-verses and drawings. Bilingual Japanese and English. ,

Documentaries
1982 – The Close To Nature Garden; produced by Rodale Press. 24 minutes. In English.
1997 – Fukuoka Masanobu goes to India; produced by Salbong. 59/61 minutes. Available in Japanese or dubbed English.
2015 - Final Straw: Food, Earth, Happiness; directed/produced by Patrick M. Lydon and Suhee Kang. 74 minutes. Subtitled in English.

See also

 Conservation agriculture
 Ecoagriculture
 Ecosystem restoration
 Reconciliation ecology
 Rewilding
 Spiritual ecology
 Vandana Shiva
 Shripad Dabholkar
 Bill Mollison
 Arne Næss
 Mokichi Okada

References

External links

 Official Website: Masanobu Fukuoka Natural Farm
 Greening The Desert: Applying natural farming techniques in Africa, interview with Masanobu Fukuoka
 Masanobu Fukuoka and Natural Farming, Gandhi Foundation
 Masanobu Fukuoka: Japanese Organic Farmer, Mother Earth News magazine
 Nature - Nature knows best, Life Positive
 Farmer philosopher Masanobu Fukuoka, part 1, 2, 3; Japan Economic Forum

1913 births
2008 deaths
Japanese Buddhists
Japanese conservationists
Japanese educators
Japanese farmers
Japanese microbiologists
Japanese philosophers
Japanese writers
Non-fiction environmental writers
Organic farmers
People from Iyo, Ehime
Permaculturalists
Ramon Magsaysay Award winners
Religious naturalists
Sustainability advocates
Sustainable food system
20th-century philosophers